Phanaeus demon is a species of beetles belonging to the family Scarabaeidae. This species is often incorrectly named as "damon" in collections and in the literature.

Subspecies
Phanaeus demon demon Castelnau, 1840 (synonym Phanaeus damon Harold, 1863)
Phanaeus demon excelsus Bates, 1887 
Phanaeus demon obliquans Bates, 1887

Description
It is a highly variable species. These beetles show an erect horn recurved towards the tip. The females are smaller than the males. Dorsum is highly shining. Color is quite variable, usually brilliant green with yellow reflections or golden green or brilliant copper-red with green reflections. Elytra have fine striae, often minutely punctured. Adults are coprophagous.

Distribution and habitat
This species is present in Mexico and Central America.

Bibliography
Harold E.von (1863) Note sur les espèces mexicains du genre Phanaeus et descriptions de quelques espèces nouvelles de coléoptères Mexicaines, Annales de la Société Entomologique de France. Paris 4(3):161-176
 Sturm J. (1843) Catalog der Kaefer-Sammlung von Jacob Sturm, Nurnberg :1-386
 Castelnau F. (1840) Histoire Naturelle des Insectes Coléoptères. Avec une introduction renfermant L'Anatomie et la Physiologie des Animaux Articulés, par M.Brullé, P.Duménil. Paris 2:1-564
 Scarabs: World Scarabaeidae Database. Schoolmeesters P., 2011-05-30

References

demon
Taxa named by François-Louis Laporte, comte de Castelnau
Beetles described in 1840